Brujadelphis is an extinct genus of river dolphin-like cetaceans of uncertain family placement from the Late Miocene epoch (Serravallian) of present-day Peru. The type species is Brujadelphis ankylorostris, recovered from the Pisco Formation.

References

Bibliography 
 

Miocene cetaceans
Miocene mammals of South America
Serravallian life
Laventan
Neogene Peru
Fossils of Peru
Pisco Formation
Fossil taxa described in 2017